The chariot that evolved from the ancient vehicle of this name (see Chariot) took on two main forms:

 A light, four-wheeled, horse-drawn carriage having a coach box and back seats only, popular in the early 19th century.
 A vehicle for conveying persons especially in state, such as a triumphal car or a coach of state. This stately but manoeuvrable horse carriage was used for ceremonial occasions or for pleasure.

A chariotee was a light, covered, four-wheeled pleasure carriage with two seats.

A post chariot was a carriage for traveling post. The term was used specifically for a kind of light four-wheeled carriage with a driver's seat in front.

A vehicle such as a cart or wagon for transporting goods was also sometimes called a chariot.

See also 
 Carriage
 Coach (carriage)
 Wagon

References

Carriages